L20, L-20 or L.20 may refer to:

Vehicles 
Aircraft
 Daimler L20, a German light aircraft
 de Havilland Canada L-20 Beaver, a Canadian utility aircraft
 Zeppelin LZ 59, an airship of the Imperial German Navy
 L-20, a United States Navy L-class blimp

Automobiles
 Scania-Vabis L20, a Swedish truck
 Severin L20, an American automobile
 Suzulight Carry (L20), a Japanese kei truck
 Toyota Tercel (L20), a Japanese subcompact car

Ships
 , a submarine of the Royal Navy
 , a destroyer of the Royal Navy
 , an amphibious warfare vessel of the Indian Navy
 , a Leninets-class submarine

Proteins 
 Mitochondrial ribosomal protein L20
 Ribosomal protein L20 leader

Other uses 
 Lectionary 20, a Greek manuscript of the New Testament, dated 1047
 Nikon Coolpix L20, a digital camera
 Nissan L20 engine, an automobile engine

See also 
 L2O, with a letter "O" instead of a zero